Henry Jones Ford (25 August 1851 – 29 August 1925) was a political scientist, journalist, university professor, and government official. He served as president of the American Political Science Association. He was appointed by Woodrow Wilson as the Banking and Insurance Commissioner of New Jersey in 1912.

Biography 
He was born on 25 August 1851 in Baltimore, Maryland. He graduated from Baltimore City College at the age of seventeen.

Ford worked as a managing editor and editorial writer from 1872 to 1905, at six different newspapers in three cities Baltimore, New York City, and Pittsburgh.

Later returning to Baltimore, Ford taught at Johns Hopkins University, and afterwards taught at the University of Pennsylvania.  Known to say that politics was a "dirty business" unsuitable for women, his students at Penn included  suffragist Alice Paul, whose experiences in his classes informed her decision to pursue master's and doctoral degrees in sociology instead of politics. Ford later took a job as professor of politics at Princeton University, at the request of the university's then-president, Woodrow Wilson.

Ford's association with Wilson also took him also into politics.  When Wilson became governor of New Jersey, he appointed Ford Commissioner of Banking and Insurance; after Wilson became president, Ford was sent to the Philippines on a special mission, reporting directly to the President, and toward the end of Wilson's presidency, Ford was named to a position on the Interstate Commerce Commission. Their association also resulted in Ford's book Woodrow Wilson, the  Man and His Work, which was an account of Wilson's experience on the presidential campaign trail.

Ford served as president of the American Political Science Association from 1918 to 1919.

He died on 29 August 1925, in Blue Ridge Summit, Pennsylvania.

Quote 
"The constitutional ideal is noble; but the politicians are vile. If only the checks could be made more effective, if only a just balance of power could be established beyond the strength of the politicians to disarrange ... the constitution would work perfectly."

Selected works 
The works marked with (e-book) are freely availables from Project Gutenberg:
 The Rise and Growth of American Politics: A Sketch of Constitutional Development (1898)
 The Cost of Our National Government: A Study in Political Pathology (1910)
 The Natural History of the State: An Introduction to Political Science (1915)
 The Scotch-Irish in America (1915)
 Woodrow Wilson, the Man and His Work: A Biographical Study (1916)
 Washington and His Colleagues: A Chronicle of the Rise and Fall of Federalism (1918; ; e-book)
 The Cleveland Era: A Chronicle of the New Order in Politics (1918; ; e-book)
 Alexander Hamilton (1920)
 Representative Government (1924)

References

External links 
 
 
 
 

American political scientists
Johns Hopkins University faculty
Baltimore City College alumni
1851 births
1925 deaths
People of the Interstate Commerce Commission